Conrad Heinrich Küchler (c. 1740 – 1810)  was a German engraver who from 1793 until his death worked as a designer of coinage and medals for the manufacturer and mint owner Matthew Boulton.

Career
Küchler was born in Flanders around 1740.
He first came to England in March 1793, where he was employed as an engraver at the Soho Mint, owned by the notable manufacturer Matthew Boulton.  He was Boulton's sole artist for designing and die-cutting, and produced the designs for various coins, medals and tokens, including the copper "cartwheel" pennies and twopences, and medals depicting the Battle of Trafalgar, Louis XVI and Marie Antoinette. He designed at least three of the obverse portraits for the long reign of George III.  He later left the Mint, but continued to be employed by Boulton's firm in London until his death.

Küchler died in Handsworth in 1810, and was buried in the churchyard of St Mary's.

References

1810 deaths
German engravers
1740 births
Coin designers